The discography of Goblini, a Serbian punk rock band from Šabac, consists of four studio albums, three live albums as well as several various artists compilations. The debut album Goblini (The Goblins), released in 1994, was recorded in the lineup Branko Golubović (vocals), Alen Jovanović (guitar), Vlada Kokotović (bass) and Nenad Divnić (drums), released on compact cassette only. During the same year, not satisfied with the album production, the band re-recorded a part of the material on the second studio album, Istinite priče I deo (True Stories Part I), featuring the new drummer Nedeljko Nedić "Meketa".

The next release, a live cassette KST Live 31.08.'95 featured a new drummer, Zoran Jević "Fric", and an additional guitarist, Leonid Pilipović, also known as Leo fon Punkerstein. The lineup recorded the next studio album, U magnovenju (In the flash), released in 1996, the first to appear on compact disc. The album followed a tour during which Pilipović was replaced by Saša Šetka and the new drummer became Vladimir Cinklocki "Cina". In 1998, the recordings from the tour were released on the double album Turneja u magnovenju 96/97 (In the flash tour 96/97), featuring a CD reissue of Istinite priče I deo, and five tracks from Goblini as bonus tracks, on the second CD. The live CD featured a bonus studio track "Punk's not dead".

The lineup Golubović, Jovanović, Kokotović and drummer Milan Arnautović recorded the band's final studio album Re Contra, released in 1999. In 2001, the band ceased to exist. The recordings from the Re Contra tour were released in 2004 as Najbolje priče (The best stories), featuring an unreleased studio track "Pričaš" ("You're talking"). The lineup which disbanded in 2001 reunited in 2010 and recorded a single which was released on August, during a short reunion tour. The band also is to record a documentary about the band in Radio Television of Vojvodina production.

Studio albums

Live albums

Singles

Music videos

Other appearances

References 

 EX YU ROCK enciklopedija 1960-2006, Janjatović Petar; 
 Goblini discography at Discogs
 Goblini at YouTube

Discographies of Serbian artists
Rock music group discographies